Fort Valley State University (FVSU, formerly Fort Valley State College and Fort Valley Normal and Industrial School) is a public land-grant historically black university in Fort Valley, Georgia. It is part of the University System of Georgia and a member-school of the Thurgood Marshall College Fund.

Fort Valley State University is the state's 1890 land-grant university and enrolls over 2,500 students. Approximately 90% of the student body is of African-American descent. The average age of undergraduates is 24 and the average age of graduate students is 33. Roughly one-third of the students live on the campus and 85% of the student body are full-time students. The university is located in the town of Fort Valley in Peach County, the original site of the state's peach industry. Its 1,365-acre (5.52 km2) main campus is Georgia's largest public university in area.

History 
Fort Valley State University (formerly Fort Valley State College) began with the 1939 consolidation of the Fort Valley High and Industrial School (chartered in 1895) and the State Teachers and Agricultural College of Forsyth (founded in 1902). The Fort Valley High and Industrial School, previously affiliated with the American Church Institute of the Protestant Episcopal Church, was transferred to state control and operation. Under the agreement, the work formerly carried on at the State Teachers and Agricultural College was consolidated with the work at Fort Valley High and Industrial School to form the Fort Valley State College.

In 1947 the state Board of Regents adopted a resolution moving the "land grant" designation from Savannah State College to Fort Valley State College. In response to the Regents' resolution, in 1949 the Georgia General Assembly officially designated the Fort Valley State College as the Land-Grant College for Negroes in Georgia. Public education was segregated at that time.

The school became Fort Valley State University, a state and land-grant university, in June 1996, and is the second largest land-grant institution.

Presidents

The president of Fort Valley State University is the chief executive officer of the university. Paul Jones has held the position since December 2015.

Academics 

Fort Valley State University offers bachelor's degrees in more than 50 majors, as well as master's degrees in several fields of study. FVSU is accredited by the Commission on Colleges of the Southern Association of Colleges and Schools (SACS) to award associate, baccalaureate, master's and specialist degrees.

Accredited degree programs include:
Teacher Education degree programs which are accredited by the National Council for Accreditation of Teacher Education (NCATE)
 The Veterinary Technology Program, accredited by the American Veterinary Medical Association (AVMA)
 The Family and Consumer Sciences Program, accredited by the American Association of Family and Consumer Sciences
 The Didactic Program in Dietetics (DPD), accredited by the Commission on Accreditation for Dietetics Education (CADE) of the American Dietetic Association
 The Child Development programs, accredited by the National Academy of Early Childhood Development Programs of the National Association for the Education of Young Children (NAEYC)
 Rehabilitation Counseling and Case Management accredited by the Council on Rehabilitation Education (CORE)

The university also offers the Cooperative Developmental Energy Program (CDEP) which provides an opportunity for qualified students to receive a STEM degree from FVSU and an engineering degree from the Georgia Institute of Technology, University of Texas at Austin, Pennsylvania State University, University of Arkansas at Fayetteville, or University of Texas at Rio Grande Valley.

The university's honors program is a selective undergraduate program designed to cater to high-achieving students.

Outreach services include Fort Valley State's Cooperative Extension Service Program, where extension service specialists operate in 42 Georgia counties, and the Pettigrew Conference Center, which hosts more than 500 courses and events for 51,000 patrons each year. In an effort to accommodate graduate and non-traditional students, external degree program courses are also being offered at off-campus sites in Macon, Cochran, Warner Robins and Dublin. The university offers online courses via WebCT, which allows students to pursue a number of majors and programs from home.

College of Arts and Sciences 
The College of Arts and Sciences, the oldest and the largest college at FVSU, houses 12 academic units and offers nearly 80 percent of the courses taught at FVSU. The college services the University System of Georgia's Academic Core and provides 20 undergraduate major fields of study. The Department of Business Administration and Economics is the largest academic department in the College of Arts and Sciences, and is an accredited member of the Accreditation Council for Business Schools and Programs (ACBSP).

College of Education 
The College of Education is an educator preparation program offering degrees in Middle Grades Education, undergraduate and graduate; Agriculture Education, undergraduate and post-baccalaureate; Early Childhood / Special Education undergraduate; School Counseling; Early Childhood / Special Education graduate; Health and Physical Education; Family and Consumer Sciences Education; and an MAT degree in the secondary teaching areas.

College of Agriculture, Family Sciences and Technology 
The College of Agriculture, Home Economics & Allied Programs is ranked 25th nationally in the production of African American agriculturists and the university's leader in placing first-time applicants into medical, dental, veterinary and pharmacy schools and colleges since 2001. The college has laboratories in the state, and scientists are securing grant funds and conducting cutting-edge research.

Campus

Pettigrew Center 
Named in honor of the late former President Dr. C.W. Pettigrew who served from 1973 to 1980, the C.W. Pettigrew Farm and Community Life Center is a full-service conference, convention, and fine arts facility where events are held by both internal and external sources. This faculty is often used for outreach programs for members of Fort Valley State University and by personnel throughout the region.

Anderson Museum and Welcome Center 
The Anderson House is Fort Valley State University's oldest building and houses the Biggs Collection. The Museum and Welcome Center is located on the corner of University Drive and Wright Street, across from Saint Luke Episcopal Church. The center provides an official reception area for visitors to the university.

Anderson House 
Anderson House was the residence of F.W. Gano, one of the university's founders. It is the oldest facility on campus. Fort Valley State University historian Dr. Donnie Bellamey places the building's construction in the late 19th century. This colonial Dutch revival style was a popular architectural design for rural cottages of that era.

The house was renovated in 1918 and served as the family home for principal Henry A. Hunt, President Horace Mann Bond, and President Cornelius V. Troup. It was named in memory of Benjamin S. Anderson, who served as Professor of Agriculture during the institution's early years.

The main exhibits and displays come from the Biggs Collection of period furnishings, silver, glassware, china, quilts, linens and civil war memorabilia. The majority of the items date from about 1860 to 1900. The English Victorian furniture outfitted the parlor, dining room and bedrooms of an antebellum home in Box Springs, Georgia, which still stands today. The contents of the home were bequeathed by the plantation owner to Mr. Biggs' grandmother, who was a slave. The Smithsonian Institution sought to obtain the quilts and antiques for its permanent anthology of historical collectibles, according to Mr. Biggs. However, he chose to donate the entire collection to Fort Valley State University in 1991.

Student activities
FVSU students have many opportunities for extracurricular involvement at the university, including NCAA Division II intercollegiate athletics, The Blue Machine Marching Band, concert choir, Baptist Student Union Choir, forensics (intercollegiate speech and debate), and cheerleading. Overall, there are more than 70 clubs, social, and Greek organizations on campus.

Student media
FVSU has a radio station (WFVS-LP 104.3 FM) and a television station (FVSU TV), as well as a college newspaper, The Peachite.

Athletics

Athletic opportunities include intramural sports and intercollegiate men's basketball, cross country, football, tennis, and track and field, and volleyball and women's basketball, cross country, softball, tennis, volleyball, and track and field. The school currently competes as a member of the Southern Intercollegiate Athletic Conference.

Alumni 
Catherine Hardy

References

External links 
 
 Fort Valley State Athletics website
 "Fort Valley Music Festivals, 1938-1943", recordings and documents, American Memory, Library of Congress

 
Educational institutions established in 1895
Historically black universities and colleges in the United States
Land-grant universities and colleges
Universities and colleges accredited by the Southern Association of Colleges and Schools
1895 establishments in Georgia (U.S. state)
Education in Peach County, Georgia
Buildings and structures in Peach County, Georgia
Public universities and colleges in Georgia (U.S. state)